Alikhan Asetov (born 26 August 1996) is a Kazakhstani ice hockey player for Barys Astana in the Kontinental Hockey League (KHL) and the Kazakhstani national team.

He represented Kazakhstan at the 2021 IIHF World Championship.

References

External links

1996 births
Living people
Barys Nur-Sultan players
Kazakhstani ice hockey right wingers
Sportspeople from Oskemen
Asian Games gold medalists for Kazakhstan
Medalists at the 2017 Asian Winter Games
Asian Games medalists in ice hockey
Ice hockey players at the 2017 Asian Winter Games